Robert Anthony Ainsworth FRS FREng is a British material scientist, and Assessment Technology Group Head, at British Energy Generation.
He is Visiting Professor in the Department of Mechanical Engineering at Imperial College, London. In 2006, he won the James Clayton Prize, from IMechE.

References

British mechanical engineers
Fellows of the Royal Society
Living people
British materials scientists
Fellows of the Royal Academy of Engineering
Year of birth missing (living people)